Valacia was the name of two ships operated by Cunard White Star Line

, built as Luceric for the Bank Line. Purchased in 1916 and scrapped in 1931.
, built as Empire Camp for the Ministry of War Transport. Managed from 1945 and purchased in 1946. Sold in 1951 to Bristol City Line.

Ship names